Edward Matthew Politz (28 July 1889 – 14 February 1967) was a former Australian rules footballer who played with Melbourne in the Victorian Football League (VFL).

Family
The son of Charles Zapp Politz (1854-1916), and Jane Politz (1856-1914), née Stewart, Edward Matthew Politz was born on 28 July 1889.

He Married Elizabeth Agnes Stanley (1894-1983) in 1914.

Football
Recruited from Yarraville Football Club in the Victorian Junior Football Association, he played his first senior match for Melbourne, against Geelong, on 1 July 1911.

His twenty-sixth (and last) senior game for Melbourne was against Essendon, in the last round of the 1913 season, on 30 August 1913.

Notes

References
 
 The Melbourne Football Team on the Sydney Visit, The Referee, (Wednesday, 13 September 1911), p.13.</ref>
 The Melbourne Football Team, The Leader, (Saturday, 29 June 1912), p.25.

External links 

 
 Ted Politz, at Demonwiki.

Australian rules footballers from Melbourne
Melbourne Football Club players
1889 births
1967 deaths
People from Richmond, Victoria